Department of Shipping is a Bangladesh government regulatory agency under the Ministry of Shipping of Bangladesh responsible for maritime safety, formulation and enforcement of maritime regulation. The Director General of the Department of Shipping is Commodore Md Nizamul Haque, (TAS), OSP, NGP, psc, BN .

History
The agency came into existence in 1976 through the merger of Directorate of Shipping and the Controller of Shipping. It is responsible for the regulation of maritime activity in Bangladesh. The department is responsible for safety of inland navigation and issuing registration and annual fitness certificates of the vessels. International Maritime Organization has scrutinized the role of the Department of Shipping over fake competency certificate issued to ships. The Department in 2016 blamed lack of flag protection and high interest rate for the dwindling number of Bangladeshi flag carry ships.

See also 

 Bangladesh Marine Fisheries Academy

References

1976 establishments in Bangladesh
Organisations based in Dhaka
Government departments of Bangladesh
Shipping in Bangladesh